Thomirey is a commune in the Côte-d'Or department in eastern France. It is on the D104 road, 23 km north west of Beaune. The village is on the Lacanche river, and includes the body of water known as the Etang de Rouhey.

Population

See also
Communes of the Côte-d'Or department

References

Communes of Côte-d'Or